Kalt-e Sofla (also Romanized as Kalt-e Soflá; also known as Kalt-e Pā'īn) is a village in Qatur Rural District, Qatur District, Khoy County, West Azerbaijan Province, Iran. At the 2006 census, its population was 485, in 87 families.

References 

Populated places in Khoy County